Kramgoa låtar 16 is a studio album by Vikingarna released in 1988. For the album, the band was awarded a Grammis Award in the "Dansband of the Year" category.

Track listing
Lördagsafton (S.Möller-M.Winald)
Tredje gången gillt (with Annika Hagström och Jacob Dahlin) (Lennart Sjöholm-Lars Westmann-Jacob Dahlin)
Den gamle vandringsmannen (Martin Klaman-Keith Almgren)
En liten människa (Nannini-Pianigiani-Monica Forsberg)
Hela veckan längtar jag till fredag (L.Holm)
Vernissage (R.Pauls-Jacob Dahlin)
100 % (Torgny Söderberg-Monica Forsberg)
Romantica (A.Melander)
När det våras i bland bergen (R.Sauer-M.H.Woolsey-S.O.Sandberg)
Sommarnatt (G.Stevens-M.Schrader)
Får jag lämna några blommor (Martin Klaman-Keith Almgren)
Dagen är din (S.Kristiansen)
Tiotusen röda rosor (Thore Skogman)
Dä årner sä (O.Bredahl-Alfson)
Längtan hem (L.Holm)

Charts

References 

1988 albums
Vikingarna (band) albums
Swedish-language albums